Helensburgh Upper railway station serves the town of Helensburgh, Scotland, on the north shore of the Firth of Clyde to the west of Glasgow. It is located in a residential area uphill from the town centre and is by far the smaller of the town's two stations. It is on the West Highland Line,  from Craigendoran Junction, near Helensburgh, the first station on the line before Garelochhead. ScotRail manage the station and operate most services, with others provided by Caledonian Sleeper.

History 

The station opened in 1894.

Originally built with an island platform in a cutting, the Up platform was taken out of use in 1968 although the station building remained in use for another few years. Latterly operated by a Wickham diesel railbus, it fell victim to the Beeching Axe in 1964.

Location 
The station is within a short walk of the Hill House, built by Charles Rennie Mackintosh and now preserved by the National Trust for Scotland. By using Helensburgh Upper station to visit the Hill House, visitors can avoid the walk uphill from Helensburgh Central railway station. However, Helensburgh Upper has an infrequent train service compared with that available to and from Helensburgh Central.

Facilities 
The single platform is equipped with a shelter, a bench, a help point and bike racks. The station has step-free access. As there are no facilities to purchase tickets, passengers must buy one in advance, or from the guard on the train.

Passenger volume 

The statistics cover twelve month periods that start in April.

Services 
Monday to Saturday, there are six services to Oban and three to Mallaig (the latter combined with Oban portions, dividing at ), and one service to Fort William (the Highland Caledonian Sleeper, weekday mornings only) northbound. Southbound, there are six services to Glasgow Queen Street High Level and one service to London Euston via Queen Street Low Level & Edinburgh Waverley (the Highland Caledonian Sleeper - does not run on Saturday).

On Sundays, there are two trains northbound to Mallaig, the Caledonian Sleeper to Fort William and one extra to Oban only, plus an extra summer service to Oban; Southbound there are three trains southbound to Glasgow Queen Street. In summer months, the extra summer Sunday service returns to Edinburgh, avoiding Glasgow.

References

Bibliography

External links

 Video footage of Helensburgh Upper

Railway stations in Argyll and Bute
Former North British Railway stations
Railway stations in Great Britain opened in 1894
Railway stations served by ScotRail
Railway stations served by Caledonian Sleeper
SPT railway stations
Upper railway station
James Miller railway stations